The 2013 World Draughts Championship was an international draughts tournament held in Ufa, Russia. 40 players from 24 countries who qualified through the championships of Europe, Asia, Africa, North and South America competed in the tournament, which began on June 2, 2013 and ended on June 20, 2013. Among them was women's Draughts World Champion Zoja Golubeva from Latvia.

Alexander Georgiev (Russia) became the World Champion. Jean Marc Ndjofang (Cameroon) took second place, and Roel Boomstra (Netherlands) took third place.

Competition

In the first stage 40 participants played in four groups named after the well-known world champions Andris Andreiko, Baba Sy, Iser Kuperman, and Marcel Deslauriers round-robin tournament. The first three from each group participated in the final.

The final was held in the form of a round-robin tournament. Matches between people who had already played each other in the group stage did not take place, but the results of those group matches were taken into account. The final place was determined by total points. In the event of a tie, the tie-breaking criteria were greatest number of victories, the greatest difference between plus and minus draws, the largest number of plus draws*, and the result of the game(s) between the players involved. Other sportsmen played in final B.

In the B final, the winner was Ndiaga Samb (Senegal).

French champion Arnaud Cordier refused to participate. He was replaced by Artem Ivanov (Ukraine).

Semifinal

Group Andreiko

Group Baba Sy

Group Deslauriers

Group Kuperman

Final

*  draw is considered a draw with the «plus» sign, if one opponent on the board for three and a more ordinary pieces  (king counts as two simple pieces).

Final B
In final B  three women played — Tamara Tansykkuzhina, Aygul Idrisova and Regina Ajupova (all from Russia).

GMI — international grandmaster

MI — international master

MF — master FMJD

GMIF — women's international grandmaster

See also 
List of Draughts World Championship winners

External links
World Championship 2013

2013 in draughts
Draughts world championships
Sport in Ufa
2013 in Russian sport
International sports competitions hosted by Russia